10th general convention of Communist Party of Nepal (Unified Marxist–Leninist) was held for 26–29 November 2021 to elect central committee members and portfolios. It was held in Sauraha, Chitwan District of Nepal.

1,999 delegates were elected while 5% was nominated.

Elected portfolios

Reference 

Internal elections of political parties in Nepal
Communist Party of Nepal (Unified Marxist–Leninist) politicians
2021 in Nepal